Arnold Chikobava (March 14, 1898 – November 5, 1985) was a Soviet Georgian linguist and philologist best known for his contributions to Caucasian studies and for being one of the most active critics of Nicholas Marr's controversial monogenetic "Japhetic" theory of language.

Chikobava was born in the small village of Sachikobavo in Samegrelo, western Georgia (then part of Imperial Russia). He graduated from the recently established Tbilisi State University in 1922 and earned a degree there, later serving as a docent (1926–33) and professor (1933-85). For years, he headed the Department of Caucasian Studies at Tbilisi State University (1933–60), and the Department of Ibero-Caucasian languages at the Institute of Linguistics in Tbilisi (1936–85). The institute, briefly directed by Chikobava from 1950 and 1952, now bears his name. In 1941, he became one of the founding members of the Georgian Academy of Sciences and was elected to its Presidium from 1950 to 1963. For his prolific work, he was awarded numerous Soviet and international prizes and titles. He authored a series of Georgian dictionaries and influential works on the structure and history of Caucasian languages.

Most of his fame, however, came through his criticism of Marr's speculative linguistic theory that was adopted, for a while, as an official ideology by Soviet scholars. While most of Marr's opponents came under heavy pressure from the Soviet authorities, Chikobava benefited from his friendship with the First Secretary of the Georgian Central Committee, Kandid Charkviani, and continued his attacks against Marr's hypotheses. Finally, he sent his report to Joseph Stalin; he met Stalin personally in 1950. Soon, Stalin denounced Marr's theory in his famous Pravda article on linguistics (one ghostwriter was, most probably, Chikobava himself).

Chikobava died in Tbilisi at the age of 87. He was buried on the grounds of Tbilisi State University.

References

External links 
 Arnold Chikobava Institute of Linguistics of the Georgian Academy of Sciences

1898 births
1985 deaths
People from Samegrelo-Zemo Svaneti
Mingrelians
Linguists from the Soviet Union
Linguists from Georgia (country)
Philologists from Georgia (country)
Academic staff of Tbilisi State University
Members of the Georgian National Academy of Sciences
Linguists of Caucasian languages
Linguists of Kartvelian languages
Paleolinguists
Linguists of North Caucasian languages
20th-century linguists
20th-century philologists
Historical linguists
Honoured Scientists of Georgia (country)